Moschopsis is a genus of flowering plants in the family Calyceraceae, native to the mid-Andes of South America; Peru, Chile and Argentina. They are compact perennial succulents appearing somewhat like small heads of broccoli or artichokes.

Species
Currently accepted species include:

Moschopsis ameghinoi (Speg.) Dusén
Moschopsis caleofuensis (Speg.) Dusén
Moschopsis leyboldii Phil.
Moschopsis monocephala (Phil.) Reiche
Moschopsis subandina (Speg.) Dusén
Moschopsis trilobata Dusén

References

Calyceraceae
Asterales genera